Soumaila Sidibe (born June 15, 1992 in Bamako) is a Malian footballer who plays for AS Police de Bamako. He plays primarily as a defensive midfielder.

Club career
In January 2015, Sidibe signed a three and a half year contract with Algerian Ligue Professionnelle 1 club MO Béjaïa, becoming the first ever foreign player in the history of the club.

International career
Sidibe was a member of the Mali national under-20 football team at the 2011 FIFA U-20 World Cup in Colombia, where he started all three all of Mali's matches.

Honours
MO Béjaïa
 Algerian Cup: 2015

References

External links
 
 
 

1992 births
Mali under-20 international footballers
Malian expatriate footballers
Malian footballers
Living people
Algerian Ligue Professionnelle 1 players
MO Béjaïa players
USM Alger players
CO de Bamako players
CR Belouizdad players
Sportspeople from Bamako
Association football midfielders
Expatriate footballers in Algeria
Malian expatriate sportspeople in Algeria
Mali international footballers
21st-century Malian people